Buysee is a last name. It is shared by the following people:
Achiel Buysse (1918–1984), Belgian cyclist
Bart Buysse (born 1986), Belgian association football player
Cyriel Buysse (1859–1932), Flemish naturalist author and playwright
Henri-Corentin Buysse (born 1988), French ice hockey player
Jules Buysse (1901–1950), Belgian racing cyclist
Kamiel Buysse (1932–2020), Belgian racing cyclist
Lucien Buysse (1892–1980), Belgian cyclist
Marcel Buysse (1889–1939), Belgian racing cyclist
Paul Buysse (born 1945), Belgian businessman
Yves Buysse (born 1968), Belgian politician